Dragan Juranović (born 10 February 1994) is a Croatian professional footballer who plays as a winger for Bosnian Premier League club Zrinjski Mostar.

References

External links
 

1994 births
Living people
Footballers from Zagreb
Association football midfielders
Croatian footballers
NK Rudeš players
NK Dubrava players
HŠK Zrinjski Mostar players
First Football League (Croatia) players
Croatian Football League players
Premier League of Bosnia and Herzegovina players
Croatian expatriate footballers
Expatriate footballers in Bosnia and Herzegovina
Croatian expatriate sportspeople in Bosnia and Herzegovina